Oakfield is an unincorporated community in Madison County, Tennessee, which borders Jackson.

History
Beginning in the late 19th century, Oakfield served as a station along the Illinois Central Railroad eight miles north of Jackson, and received both freight and passenger trains.

References

Unincorporated communities in Tennessee
Unincorporated communities in Madison County, Tennessee